Schirnding station is a railway station in the municipality of Schirnding, located in the Wunsiedel district in Bavaria, Germany.

References

Railway stations in Bavaria
Buildings and structures in Wunsiedel (district)